Hermon Porter Williams (February 16, 1872 – July 21, 1958) was an American football coach.  He was the second head football coach for the Drake University in Des Moines, Iowa, and he held that position for the 1895 season. His coaching record at Drake was 1–4.

Head coaching record

References

External links
 

1872 births
1958 deaths
Drake Bulldogs football coaches
Drake University alumni
Sportspeople from Iowa City, Iowa